Bruning or Brüning may refer to:

 Bruning (surname)
 Bruning Army Airfield, a former airfield
 Brüning Museum, a Peruvian museum
 Bruning, Nebraska

See also
 Brunning
 Citizens for Equal Protection v. Bruning